EESI may refer to:

Environmental and Energy Study Institute
Extractive electrospray ionization